Nikolai Nikolayevich Kostechko (25 November 1946 – 3 July 2022) was an officer of the Soviet Main Intelligence Directorate (GRU) and its Russian successor, the Main Directorate of the General Staff. He rose to the rank of colonel general and served as the Main Directorate's Chief of Staff and First Deputy Director. He was awarded the title of Hero of the Russian Federation in 2000.

Early life
He enrolled in the Cherepovets Military School of Communications, graduating from there in 1967, and was assigned to serve in special units of the Soviet Main Intelligence Directorate (GRU). He served during the Soviet–Afghan War with the 40th Army, and went on to see action in the Second Chechen War as head of a number of special forces' operations in the region. He oversaw trials of the Ka-50 helicopter and recommended it be adopted into service. He was also involved in the production of the 1993 film , which brought the helicopter and the work of Russian special forces to public attention.

Higher intelligence posts
Kostechko was appointed head of the GRU's 14th Directorate during the 1990s, and then Chief of Staff and First Deputy Director of the Main Intelligence Directorate, a post he held until 2009. On 19 February 2000 he was awarded the title of Hero of the Russian Federation, with the Gold Star medal number 578. He was promoted to the rank of colonel general on 10 December 2002, and retired from military service in 2009.

Over his career he was awarded the Order of the Red Star, the Order "For Merit to the Fatherland" Fourth Class, the Order of Courage, the Order of Military Merit, an Honorary Diploma of the Russian Government on 23 November 2006, and various foreign orders and medals. He was also a laureate of the USSR State Prize and the State Prize of the Russian Federation. He had also been made an honorary citizen of the Pinsk Region in 2006.

In retirement Kostechko lived in Moscow, where he died on 3 July 2022 at the age of 75.

References 

1946 births
2022 deaths
People from Pinsk District
Russian colonel generals
GRU officers
Heroes of the Russian Federation
Recipients of the Order of Military Merit (Russia)
Recipients of the Order "For Merit to the Fatherland", 4th class
Recipients of the Order of Courage
Recipients of the Order of the Red Star
Soviet military personnel of the Soviet–Afghan War
Military Academy of the General Staff of the Armed Forces of Russia alumni
Recipients of the USSR State Prize
State Prize of the Russian Federation laureates